The 2005 Men's EuroHockey Nations Trophy was the first ever edition of the Men's EuroHockey Nations Trophy, the second level of the men's European field hockey championships organized by the European Hockey Federation. It was held in Rome, Italy from 11 to 17 September 2005.

The number one and two were promoted to the "A"-level, the 2007 Men's EuroHockey Nations Championship, while the number seven and eight were relegated to the "C"-level, the 2007 Men's EuroHockey Nations Challenge I.

Results
All times are local, CEST (UTC+2).

Preliminary round

Pool A

Pool B

Fifth to eighth place classification

5–8th place semi-finals

Seventh place game

Fifth place game

First to fourth place classification

Semi-finals

Third place game

Final

Final standings

 Qualified for the 2007 EuroHockey Championship

 Relegated to the EuroHockey Challenge I

See also
2005 Men's EuroHockey Nations Challenge I
2005 Men's EuroHockey Nations Championship

References

External links
EuroHockey

EuroHockey Championship II
Men 2
EuroHockey Nations Trophy Men
EuroHockey Nations Trophy Men
International field hockey competitions hosted by Italy
Sports competitions in Rome
2000s in Rome